Ironton is a small unincorporated community in Pulaski County, Arkansas, United States, to the west of Wrightsville, and near Landmark. Namesakes include Ironton Baptist Church, Ironton Road, and Ironton cut-off. There are a few businesses in Ironton, and a fishing area.

The area is in the Pulaski County Special School District.

References

Unincorporated communities in Arkansas
Unincorporated communities in Pulaski County, Arkansas